Heumen is a municipality and a village in the eastern Netherlands.

Population centres 
Heumen
Malden (administrative centre)
Molenhoek (partly)
Nederasselt
Overasselt

Topography

Dutch Topographic map of the municipality of Heumen, June 2015

Notable people 
 Wisse Alfred Pierre Smit (1903–1986) a poet and an influential Dutch literary historian of the Dutch Golden Age 
 Frans Thijssen (born 1952 in Malden) a former international Dutch footballer with 628 club caps
 Sabina Brons (born 1965) stage name Selena a Dutch singer
 Bram Nuytinck (born 1990) a Dutch footballer with over 270 club caps

Gallery

References

External links

Official website

 
Municipalities of Gelderland
Populated places in Gelderland